The 2011 South Asian Football Federation Championship, sponsored by Karbonn Mobiles and officially named Karbonn SAFF Championship 2011, was the 9th tournament of the SAFF Championship, which held in New Delhi, India.

Venue
It was originally scheduled to take place in Orissa, India, but was switched to New Delhi by the executive committee of the All India Football Federation on 22 September.

The Jawaharlal Nehru Stadium in New Delhi was the main venue for the tournament. It is also the home stadium for India national football team and hosted the 2010 Commonwealth Games.

Squads

Draw
The draw ceremony took place on 2 November 2011 at New Delhi's Le Meridien Hotel was attended by a host of dignitaries including AIFF General Secretary Kushal Das, SAFF General Secretary Alberto Colaco and Maldives Football Association General Secretary Shah Ismail.

(The FIFA rankings of the teams at the start of the tournament are given in brackets in the table)

Group stage
All times are Indian Standard Time (IST) – UTC+5:30

Group A

Group B

Knockout stage

Bracket

Semi-finals

Final

Champion

Awards

Statistics

Goalscorers
7 goals
  Sunil Chhetri

6 goals
  Balal Arezou

3 goals
  Clifford Miranda

2 goals

  Sandjar Ahmadi
  Ata Yamrali
  Syed Rahim Nabi
  Jeje Lalpekhlua
  Ali Ashfaq
  Ahmed Thariq
  Nipuna Bandara
  Mohamed Zain

1 goal

  Zohib Islam Amiri
  Mohammad Mashriqi
  Djelaludin Sharityar
  Shahedul Alam Shahed
  Chencho Gyeltshen
  Sushil Kumar Singh
  Shamweel Qasim
  Bharat Khawas
  Sandip Rai
  Sagar Thapa
  Samar Ishaq                           

Own goal
  Bandara Warakagoda (against India)

Other statistics
 Most wins  India 4 wins
 Most Losses  Bhutan 3 loss
 Most Draws  Pakistan 3 draws
 First goal of the tournament Ali Ashfaq for  Maldives vs  Nepal
 Most goals scored in a match  Afghanistan 8 Goals vs  Bhutan 
 Lowest scores in a match 1.  Bangladesh vs  Pakistan 0-0
2.  Pakistan vs  Maldives 0-0 
 Most Goals in a match by one player Balal Arezou for  vs  4 Goals
 Fastest Goal of the tournament Ata Yamrali for  vs  in 4 Minutes
 Best Defender Djelaludin Sharityar of 
 Best match of the tournament  vs  1-0

Broadcasting

YouTube Live
In a deal with World Sport Group and SAFF's exclusive marketing and media partner, all matches were shown live on YouTube. The live matches are accessible globally through SAFF Youtube Channel except in India, where they were available on a delayed basis the following day.

Television

1 Only Afghan matches
2 Only Indian matches

References

 
South Asian
South Asian
2011
SAFF Championship
Sport in New Delhi
2010s in Delhi